The Heinkel He 100 was a German pre-World War II fighter aircraft design from Heinkel. Although it proved to be one of the fastest fighter aircraft in the world at the time of its development, the design was not ordered into series production. Approximately 19 prototypes and pre-production examples were built. None are known to have survived the war.

The reason for the He 100 failing to reach production status is mostly unknown. Officially, the Luftwaffe rejected the He 100 to concentrate single-seat fighter development on the Messerschmitt Bf 109. Following the adoption of the Bf 109 and Messerschmitt Bf 110 as the Luftwaffe's standard fighter types, the Ministry of Aviation (the Reichsluftfahrtministerium or RLM) announced a "rationalization" policy that placed fighter development at Messerschmitt and bomber development at Heinkel.

Because there are no surviving examples, and since many factory documents - including all blueprints for the He 100 - were destroyed during a bombing raid, there is limited specific information about the design and its unique systems.

Development
Following the selection by the RLM of the Bf 109 as its next single-seat fighter over the He 112, Ernst Heinkel became interested in a new fighter that would leap beyond the performance of the Bf 109 as much as the Bf 109 had over the biplanes it replaced. Other German designers had similar ambitions, including Kurt Tank at Focke-Wulf. There was never an official project on the part of the RLM, but Rudolf Lucht felt that new designs were important enough to fund the projects from both companies to provide "super-pursuit" designs for evaluation. This would result in the single-engined He 100 fighter, and the promising twin-engine Fw 187 Falke Zerstörer-style heavy fighter, both reaching the flight stage of development.

Walter Günter, one half of the famous Günter brothers, looked at the existing He 112, which had already been heavily revised into the He 112B version and decided it had reached the end of its evolution. He started over with a completely new design, Projekt 1035. Learning from past mistakes on the 112 project, the design was to be as easy to build as possible yet  was a design goal. To ease production, the new design had considerably fewer parts than the 112 and those that remained contained fewer compound curves. In comparison, the 112 had 2,885 parts and 26,864 rivets, while the P.1035 was made of 969 unique parts with 11,543 rivets. The new straight-edged wing was a source of much of the savings; after building the first wings, Otto Butter reported that the reduction in complexity and rivet count (along with the Butter brothers' own explosive rivet system) saved an astonishing 1,150 man hours per wing.

The super-pursuit type was not a secret, but Ernst Heinkel preferred to work in private and publicly display his products only after they were developed sufficiently to make a stunning first impression. As an example of this, the mock-up for the extremely modern-looking He 100 was the subject of company Memo No.3657 on 31 January that stated: "The mock-up is to be completed by us ... as of the beginning of May ... and be ready to present to the RLM ... and prior to that no one at the RLM is to know of the existence of the mock-up."

Walter Günter was killed in a car accident on 25 May 1937, and the design work was taken over by his twin brother Siegfried, who finished the final draft of the design later that year. Heinrich Hertel, a specialist in aircraft structures, also played a prominent role in the design. At the end of October the design was submitted to the RLM, complete with details on prototypes, delivery dates and prices for three aircraft delivered to the Rechlin test center.

He 100 should have been designated He 113, but since the number "13" was unlucky, this had been dropped. It is reported that Ernst Heinkel lobbied for this "round" number in the hope that it would improve the design's chances for production.

Design

In order to get the promised performance out of the aircraft, the design included a number of drag-reducing features. On the simple end was a well-faired cockpit, the absence of struts and other drag-inducing supports on the tail. The landing gear (including the tailwheel) was retractable and completely enclosed in flight.

There was also a serious shortage of advanced aero engines in Germany during the late 1930s. The He 100 used the same Daimler-Benz DB 601 engine as the Messerschmitt Bf 109 and Bf 110, and there was insufficient capacity to support another aircraft using the same engine. The only available alternative engine was the Junkers Jumo 211, and Heinkel was encouraged to consider its use in the He 100. However, the early Jumo 211 then available did not use a pressurized cooling system, and it was therefore not suitable for the He 100's evaporative cooling system. Furthermore, a Jumo 211-powered He 100 would not have been able to outperform the contemporary DB 601-powered Bf 109 because the supercharger on the early Jumo 211 was not fully shrouded. In order to reduce weight and frontal area, the engine was mounted directly to the forward fuselage, which was strengthened and literally tailored to the DB 601, as opposed to conventional mounting on engine bearers. The cowling was very tight-fitting, and as a result the aircraft has something of a slab-sided appearance.

In order to provide as much power as possible from the DB 601, exhaust ejectors were used to provide a small amount of additional thrust. The supercharger inlet was moved from the normal position on the side of the cowling to a location in the leading edge of the left wing, which was also a feature of the earlier and larger He 119 experimental high-speed reconnaissance aircraft. Although cleaner-looking, the long, curved induction pipe most probably negated any benefit.

Engine coolant and oil cooling systems 
For the rest of the designed performance increase with the DB 601 powerplant, Walter turned to the somewhat risky and still experimental method of cooling the engine via evaporative cooling. Such systems had been in vogue in several countries at the time. Heinkel and the Günter brothers were avid proponents of the technology, and had previously used it on the He 119, with promising results. Evaporative or "steam" cooling promised a completely drag-free cooling system. The DB 601 was a pressure-cooled engine in that the water/glycol coolant was kept in liquid form by pressure, even though its temperature was allowed to exceed the normal boiling point. Heinkel's system took advantage of that fact and the cooling energy loss associated with the phase change of the coolant as it boils. Following is a description of what is known about the final version of Heinkel's cooling system. It is based entirely on careful study of surviving photographs of the He 100, since no detailed plans survive. The earlier prototypes varied, but they were all eventually modified to something close to the final standard before they were exported to the Soviet Union.

Coolant exits the DB 601 at two points located at the front of the engine and at the base of each cylinder block casting immediately adjacent to the crank case. In the Heinkel system, an "S"-shaped steel pipe took the coolant from each side of the engine to one of two steam separators mounted alongside the engine's reduction gear and immediately behind the propeller spinner. The vertically mounted, tube-shaped separators contained a centrifugal impeller at the top connected to an impeller-type scavenge pump at the bottom. The coolant was expanded through the upper impeller where it lost pressure, boiled and cooled. The by-product was mostly very hot coolant and some steam. The liquid coolant was slung by the centrifugal impeller to the sides of the separator where it fell by gravity to the bottom of the unit. There, it was pumped to header tanks located in the leading edges of both wings by the scavenge pump. The presence of the scavenge pump was necessary to ensure the entire separator did not simply fill up with high-pressure coolant coming from the engine.

Existing photographs of the engine bay of the final pre-production version of this system clearly show the liquid coolant from both separators was piped along the bottom left side of the engine compartment and into the right wing. The header tanks were located in the outer wing panels ahead of the main spar and immediately outboard of the main landing gear bays. The tanks extended over the same portion of the outer panel's span as the outer flaps. Coolant from the right wing header tank was pumped by a separate, electrical pump to the left wing header tank. Along the way from the right to left wing, the coolant passed through a conventional radiator mounted on the bottom of the fuselage. That radiator was retractable and intended for use only during ground-running or low-speed flight. Nevertheless, coolant passed through it whenever the engine was running and regardless of whether it was extended or retracted. In the retracted position, the radiator offered little cooling, but some heat was exchanged into the aft fuselage. Finally, a return tube connected the left wing's header tank to that on the right. This allowed the coolant to equalize between the two header tanks and circulate through the retractable radiator. The engine drew coolant directly from both header tanks through two separate pipes that ran through the main landing gear bays, up the firewall at the back of the engine compartment, and into the usual coolant intakes located at the top rear of the engine.

The steam collected in the separators was vented separately from the liquid coolant. The steam did not require mechanical pumping to do this, and the buildup of pressure inside the separator was sufficient. The steam was piped down the lower right side of the engine bay and led into the open spaces between the upper and lower wing skins of the outer wing panels. There, it further expanded and condensed by cooling through the skins. The entire outer wing, both ahead of and behind the main spar, was used for this purpose covering that portion of the span containing the ailerons (the fuel was also carried entirely in the wings and occupied the areas behind the main spar in the center section and immediately ahead of the outboard flaps). The condensate was scavenged by electrically-driven centrifugal pumps and fed to the header tanks. Sources indicate as many as 22 separate pumps were used for this, each with their own attendant pilot light on the instrument panel, but it is not clear whether that number includes all of the pumps in the entire water- and oil-cooling systems or merely the number of pumps in the outer wing panels. The former is generally accepted.

Some sources state the outer wing panels used double skins top and bottom with the steam being ducted into a thin space between the outer and inner skins for cooling. A double-skinned panel was used in the oil cooling system, but surviving photographs of the wings indicate that they were conventionally single-skinned, and that the coolant was simply piped into the open spaces of the structure. Double skinning over such an extensive area would have made the aircraft unacceptably heavy. Furthermore, there was no access to the inner structure to repair damage such as a bullet hole from the inside, as would be needed if the system used a double skin. A similar system was used by the earlier Supermarine Type 224. Contrary to assertions in some references, all of the He 100s that were built used the evaporative cooling system described above. A derivative of this system was also intended for a late-war project based on the He 100, designated P.1076.

Unlike the cooling fluid, oil cannot be allowed to boil. This presented a particular problem with DB 601-series engines, because oil is sprayed against the bottom of the pistons, resulting in a considerable amount of heat being transferred to the oil as opposed to the coolant. The He 100's oil cooling system was conceptually similar to the water cooling system in that vapor was generated using the heat of the oil and condensed back to liquid by surface cooling through the skins of the airframe. A heat exchanger was used to cool the oil by boiling ethyl alcohol. The oil itself was simply piped to and from this exchanger, which was apparently located in the aft fuselage. The alcohol vapor was piped into the fixed portions of the horizontal and vertical stabilizers and into a double-skinned portion of the upper-aft fuselage behind the cockpit. This fuselage "turtle deck" panel was the only double-skinned portion of the aircraft's cooling system. The use of a double-skinned panel was possible here because the inside of panel was accessible in the event of repair. Condensed alcohol was collected by a series of bellows pumps and returned to a single header tank that fed the heat exchanger. Some sources speculate that a small air intake located at the bottom front of the engine cowl was used for an auxiliary oil cooler. No such cooler was fitted, nor was there room for one at that point. This small inlet served simply to admit cool air into what was a very hot portion of the engine bay. Immediately above this vent were the two steam separators, and immediately behind it were the hot coolant pipes coming from the separators.

World speed record

One aspect of the original Projekt 1035 was the intent to capture the absolute speed record for Heinkel and Germany. Both Messerschmitt and Heinkel vied for this record before the war. The third and eighth prototypes were specially modified for speed, with unique outer wing panels of reduced span. The third prototype crashed during testing. The record flight was made using a special version of the DB 601 engine that offered  and had a service life of just 30 minutes. Udet's record was apparently set using a standard DB 601a engine.

However, although the Me 209 V1 (known erroneously as the "Me 109R", ignoring the July 1938-dated change in prefixes) officially won over the He 100 and held the world speed record for piston engined aircraft for roughly 30 years, some historians such as Erwin Hood, state that the Me 209 V1's flight was 450 meters above sea level due to the topography of where its flight was held (at Augsburg) compared to that the He 100 V8's location of 50 meters above sea level (in Mecklenburg), thus their speed comparisons are not valid as the higher an aircraft goes, the lower the density of the atmosphere is, thus there is less drag. Hood then asserts that, based on his own calculations, if the He 100 V8 had flown at the same altitude of the Me 209 V1, it would have obtained a speed of 757 km/h.

Designation debate 
There is a debate regarding the correct designation of the He 100 aircraft actually built. One group holds that all of the machines were either Versuchs or "trials" prototypes and pre-production "A-0" series machines. This is consistent with the RLM's normal practice of changing an aircraft's sub-designation only with a significant redesign, such as an engine change. All of the He 100s built were essentially the same, and even the prototypes were later updated to the production standard before they were exported to the Soviet Union. The second group holds that the Heinkel factory intended "A", "B", "C" and "D" series aircraft, and the final version was the "D."  This camp also holds that there were separate "D-0" and "D-1" production runs, although in extremely limited numbers. Most literature follows the latter school of thought. Since the He 100 was never accepted for operational use by the Luftwaffe, it is unlikely there was ever an official resolution of this issue. The separate letter designations "A" through "D" appear to have come from internal Heinkel documents.

Prototypes

The first prototype He 100 V1 flew on 22 January 1938, only a week after its promised delivery date. The aircraft proved to be outstandingly fast. However, it continued to share a number of problems with the earlier He 112, notably a lack of directional stability. In addition, the Luftwaffe test pilots disliked the high wing loading, which resulted in landing speeds so great that they often had to use brakes right up to the last  of the runway. The ground crews also disliked the design, complaining about the tight cowling which made servicing the engine difficult. But the big problem turned out to be the cooling system, largely to no one's surprise. After a series of test flights V1 was sent to Rechlin in March.

The second prototype  He 100 V2 addressed the stability problems by changing the vertical stabilizer from a triangular form to a larger and more rectangular form. The oil-cooling system continued to be problematic, so it was removed and replaced with a small semi retractable radiator below the wing. It also received the still-experimental DB 601M engine which the aircraft was originally designed for. The M version was modified to run on "C3" fuel at 100 octane, which would allow it to run at higher power ratings in the future.

V2 was completed in March, but instead of moving to Rechlin it was kept at the factory for an attempt on the 100 km (62 mi) closed circuit speed record. After some time cleaning out the bugs the record attempt was set to be flown by Captain Herting, who had previously flown the aircraft several times.

At this point Ernst Udet showed up and asked to fly V2, after pointing out he had flown the V1 at Rechlin. Several of the cooling pumps failed on this flight as well, but Udet wasn't sure what the lights meant and simply ignored them.

The record was heavily publicized, but in the press the aircraft was referred to as the "He 112U". Apparently, the "U" stood for "Udet". At the time the 112 was still in production and looking for customers, so this was one way to boost sales of the older design. V2 was then moved to Rechlin for continued testing. Later in October, the aircraft was damaged on landing when the tail wheel didn't extend, and it is unclear if the damage was repaired.

The canopy was replaced with a much smaller and more rounded version, and all of the bumps and joints were puttied over and sanded down. The aircraft was equipped with the 601M and flown at the factory.

In August, the DB 601R engine arrived from Daimler-Benz and was installed. This version increased the maximum rpm from 2,200 to 3,000, and added methyl alcohol to the fuel mixture to improve cooling in the supercharger and thus increase boost. The aircraft was then moved to Warnemünde for the record attempt in September.

On one of the pre-record test flights by the Heinkel chief pilot, Gerhard Nitschke, the main gear failed to extend and ended up stuck half open. Since the aircraft could not be safely landed it was decided to have Nitschke bail out and let the aircraft crash in a safe spot on the airfield. Gerhard was injured when he hit the tail on the way out, and made no further record attempts.

V4 was to have been the only "production" prototype and was referred to as the "100B" model (V1 through V3 being "A" models). It was completed in the summer and delivered to Rechlin, so it wasn't available for modification into racing trim when V3 crashed. Although the aircraft was unarmed it was otherwise a service model with the 601M, and in testing over the summer it proved to be considerably faster than the Bf 109. At sea level, the aircraft could reach , faster than the Bf 109E's speed at its best altitude. The aircraft had flown a number of times before its landing gear collapsed while standing on the pad on 22 October. The aircraft was later rebuilt and was flying by March 1939.

Although V4 was to have been the last of the prototypes in the original plans, production was allowed to continue with a new series of six aircraft. One of the airframes was selected to replace V3, and as luck would have it V8 was at the "right point" in its construction and was completed out of turn. It first flew on 1 December but this was with a standard DB 601Aa engine. The 601R was then put in the aircraft on 8 January 1939, and moved to a new course at Oranienberg. Once again the aircraft was referred to as the He 112U in the press. It is unclear what happened to V8 in the end; it may have been used for crash testing.

V5 was completed like V4, and first flew on 16 November. It was later used in a film about V8's record attempt, in order to protect the record breaking aircraft. At this point, a number of changes were made to the design resulting in the "100C" model, and with the exception of V8 the rest of the prototypes were all delivered as the C standard.

V6 was first flown in February 1939, and after some test flights at the factory it was flown to Rechlin on 25 April. There it spent most of its time as an engine testbed. On 9 June, the gear failed inflight, but the pilot managed to land the aircraft with little damage, and it was returned to flying condition in six days.

V7 was completed on 24 May with a change to the oil cooling system. It was the first to be delivered with armament, consisting of two  MG FF cannon in the wings and four  MG 17 machine guns arranged around the engine cowling. This made the He 100 the most heavily armed fighter of its day. V7 was then flown to Rechlin where the armament was removed and the aircraft was used for a series of high speed test flights.

V9 was also completed and armed, but was used solely for crash testing and was "tested to destruction". V10 was originally to suffer a similar fate, but instead ended up being given the racing wings and canopy of the V8 and displayed in the German Museum in Munich as the record-setting "He 112U". It was later destroyed in a bombing attack.

Overheating problems and general failures with the cooling system motors continued to be a problem. Throughout the testing period, failures of the pumps ended flights early, although some of the test pilots simply started ignoring them. In March, Kleinemeyer wrote a memo to Ernst Heinkel about the continuing problems, stating that Schwärzler had asked to be put on the problem.

Another problem that was never cured during the prototype stage was a rash of landing gear problems. Although the wide-set gear should have eliminated the collapse of landing gears that plagued the Bf 109, especially in the difficult take-offs and landings, the He 100's landing gear was not built to withstand heavy use, and as a result they were no improvement over the Bf 109. V2, 3, 4 and 6 were all damaged to various degrees due to various gear failures, a full half of the prototypes.

Operational history

He 100 D-0
Throughout the prototype period, the various models were given series designations (as noted above), and presented to the RLM as the basis for series production. The Luftwaffe never took Heinkel up on their offer although the company decided to build a total of 25 of the aircraft one way or the other, so with 10 down, there were another 15 of the latest model to go. In keeping with general practice, any series production is started with a limited run of "zero series", resulting in the He 100 D-0.

The D-0 was similar to the earlier C models, with a few notable changes. Primary among these was a larger vertical tail in order to finally solve the stability issues. In addition, the cockpit and canopy were slightly redesigned, with the pilot sitting high in a large canopy with excellent vision in all directions. The armament was reduced from the C model to one  MG FF/M in the engine V firing through the propeller spinner, and two 7.92 mm (.30-caliber) MG 17s in the wings close to the fuselage.

The three D-0 aircraft were completed by the summer of 1939 and stayed at the Heinkel Marienehe plant for testing. They were later sold to the Japanese Imperial Navy to serve as pattern aircraft for a production line, and were shipped there in 1940. They received the designation AXHei.

He 100 D-1
The final evolution of the short He 100 history is the D-1 model. As the name suggests, the design was supposed to be very similar to the pre-production D-0s, the main planned change being to enlarge the horizontal stabilizer.

But the big change was the eventual abandonment of the surface cooling system, which proved to be too complex and failure-prone. Instead an even larger version of the retractable radiator was installed, and this appeared to completely cure the problems. The radiator was inserted in a "plug" below the cockpit, and as a result the wings were widened slightly.

While the aircraft didn't match its design goal of  once it was loaded down with weapons, the larger canopy and the radiator, it was still capable of speeds in the  range. A low drag airframe is good for both speed and range, and as a result the He 100 had a combat range of  compared to the Bf 109's . While not in the same league as the later escort fighters, this was at the time a superb range, which suggests that a production Heinkel 100 might have offset the need for the Bf 110 to some degree.

By this point, the war was under way, and as the Luftwaffe would not purchase the aircraft in its current form, the production line was shut down. There were allegations that politics played a role in killing the He 100.

The remaining 12 He 100 D-1 fighters were used to form Heinkel's Marienehe factory defense unit, flown by factory test pilots. They replaced the earlier He 112s that were used for the same purpose, and the 112s were later sold. At this early stage in the war, there were no bombers venturing that far into Germany, and it appears that the unit never saw action. The eventual fate of the D-1s remains unknown. The aircraft were also used for a propaganda spoof, as the supposed Heinkel He 113.

Foreign use
When the war opened in 1939 Heinkel was allowed to look for foreign licensees for the design. Japanese and Soviet delegations visited the Marienehe factory on 30 October 1939 and were both impressed by the design. The Soviets were particularly interested in the surface cooling system, having built the experimental Ilyushin I-21 with evaporative cooling and to gain experience with it they purchased the six surviving prototypes (V1, V2, V4, V5, V6 and V7). After arriving in the USSR they were passed onto the TsAGI institute for study.

The Japanese were also looking for new designs, notably those using inline engines, where they had little experience and purchased the three D-0s for 1.2 million RM, as well as a license for production and a set of jigs for another 1.6 million RM. The three D-0s arrived in Japan in May 1940 and were re-assembled at Kasumigaura. They were then delivered to the Japanese Naval Air Force where they were renamed AXHe1, for "Experimental Heinkel Fighter". When referring to the German design, the aircraft is called both the He 100 and He 113, with at least one set of plans bearing the latter name.

The prototypes were accompanied by Heinkel test pilot Gerhard Nitschke, who worked with Lieutenant Mitsugi Kofukuda during the tesing and evaluation. The Navy was so impressed by tests that they planned to put the aircraft into production as soon as possible, as their land-based interceptor. (Unlike every other armed forces organization in the world, the Japanese Army and Navy both fielded complete land-based air forces.) Hitachi won the contract for the aircraft and started construction of a factory in Chiba for its production. With the European war on, the jigs and plans never arrived.

Further developments
In late 1944, the RLM went to manufacturers for a new high-altitude fighter with excellent performance; the Ta 152H (an inline engined version of the Focke-Wulf Fw 190) was in limited production but Heinkel was contracted to design an aircraft and Siegfried Günter was placed in charge of the new Projekt 1076. The new design was similar to the He 100 but many detail changes resulted in an aircraft that looked all new. It sported a new and longer wing for high-altitude work, which lost the inverted gull wing bend and was swept forward slightly at 8°. Flaps or ailerons spanned the entire trailing edge of the wing giving it a rather modern appearance. The cockpit was pressurized for high-altitude flying and covered with a small bubble canopy that was hinged to the side instead of sliding to the rear. Other changes that seem odd in retrospect is that the gear now retracted outward like the original Bf 109 and the surface cooling system was re-introduced. Planned armament was one  MK 103 cannon firing through the propeller hub and two wing mounted 30mm MK 108 cannons.

The 603M and 213E both supplied  using MW-50 water injection. Performance with the 603N was projected to be , in the same class as the Messerschmitt Me 262 pioneering jet fighter then entering service testing, which would have stood as a record for many years, even against specialist racing machines. Performance would still be excellent even with the far more likely -output and above class aviation piston engines, which eventually proved to be a severe technological barrier for the German aero-engine industry during the war years.

These figures are somewhat suspect and are likely to be optimistic guesses that could not have been realised, something Heinkel was famous for. Propellers lose efficiency as they approach the speed of sound and eventually they no longer provide an increase in thrust for an increase in engine power. The only remaining gain of thrust would come from the piston engine exhausts. The advanced contra-rotating Vereinigte Deutsche Metallwerke (VDM)-origin propeller design is unlikely to have been able to counteract this problem. The design apparently received low priority and it was not complete by the end of the war. Siegfried Günter later provided detailed drawings and plans for the Americans in mid-1945.

Legacy

In 1939, it was reputedly one of the world's most advanced fighter designs, even faster than the later Fw 190, with performance unrivalled until the introduction of the Vought F4U Corsair in 1943, with the similarly-powered Republic XP-47J hitting 505 mph (813 km/h) in early August 1944. Nevertheless, the aircraft was not ordered into production. The reason why the He 100 was not put into service seems to vary depending on the person telling the story, and picking any one version results in a firestorm of protest.

Some say it was politics that killed the He 100. However, this seems to stem primarily from Heinkel's own telling of the story, which in turn seems to be based on some general malaise over the He 112 debacle. The fact is that Heinkel was well respected within the establishment, regardless of Messerschmitt's success with the Bf 109 and Bf 110, and this argument seems particularly weak.

Others blame the bizarre production line philosophy of the RLM, which valued huge numbers of single designs over a mix of different aircraft. This too seems somewhat suspect, considering that the Fw 190 was purchased shortly after this story ends.

For these reasons, it seems safe to accept the RLM version of the story largely at face value; that the production problems with the DB series of engines were so acute that all other designs based on the engine were canceled. At the time the DB 601 engines were being used in both the Bf 109 and Bf 110 aircraft, and Daimler could not keep up with those demands alone. The RLM eventually forbade anyone but Messerschmitt from receiving any DB 601s, leading to the shelving of many designs from a number of vendors. Furthermore, the Bf 109 and Bf 110 were perceived as superior to their likely opponents, which made the requirement for an even more powerful aircraft less imperative.

The only option open to Heinkel was a switch to another engine, and the RLM expressed some interest in purchasing such a version of the He 100. At the time the only other useful inline engine was the Junkers Jumo 211, and even that was in short supply. However, the design of the He 100 made adaptation to the 211 difficult; both the cooling system and the engine mounts were designed for the 601, and a switch to the 211 would have required a redesign. Heinkel felt that it was not worth the effort, considering that the aircraft would end up with inferior performance, and so the He 100 production ends on that sour note. For this reason, more than any other, the Focke-Wulf Fw 190 became the next great aircraft of the Luftwaffe, as it was based around the otherwise unused Bramo 139 (and later BMW 801) radial engine. Although production of these engines was only starting, the lines for the airframes and aircraft could be geared up in parallel without interrupting production of any existing design, which was exactly what happened.

Aircraft on display
A full scale mockup of a He 100D-1 is on display at the Planes of Fame Air Museum in Chino, California. No original He 100 airframes are known to exist.

Specifications (He 100 D-1)

See also

References

Notes

Bibliography
 Dabrowski, Hans-Peter. Heinkel He 100, World Record and Propaganda Aircraft. Atglen, Pennsylvania: Schiffer Publishing, 1991. .
 Donald, David, ed. The Encyclopedia of World Aircraft Etobicoke, Ontario: Prospero Books, 1997. .
 Fleischer, Seweryn. Heinkel 100 (Wydawnictwo Militaria 169) (in Polish). Warszawa, Poland: Wydawnictwo Militaria, 2002. .
 Green, William. "Heinkel's Hoaxer". RAF Flying Review, February 1963.
 Green, William. Warplanes of the Third Reich. London: Macdonald and Jane's Publishers Ltd., 1970 (fourth Impression 1979). .
 Green, William and Gordon Swanborough. "Heinkel's High Speed Hoaxer: The Annals of the He 100." Air Enthusiast, Vol. 38, January–April 1989. .
 Heinkel, Ernst. Stormy Life. New York: E.P. Dutton, 1956.
 Hirsch, R.S. Heinkel 100, 112 (Aero Series 12). Fallbrook, California: Aero Publishers, Inc., 1967. .
 Hood, Erwin. Heinkel He 100 Record Breaker. Hinkley, UK: Midland Publishing, 2007. .

 Lepage, Jean-Denis G.G. Aircraft of the Luftwaffe, 1935-1945: An Illustrated Guide. Jefferson, North Carolina: McFarland & Company, 2009. .
 Smith J. Richard and Anthony Kay. German Aircraft of the Second World War. London: Putnam & Company Ltd., 1972 (3rd impression 1978). .
 Wagner, Ray and Heinz Nowarra. German Combat Planes: A Comprehensive Survey and History of the Development of German Military Aircraft from 1914 to 1945. New York: Doubleday, 1971. .

External links

 AIR 40/237
 Luftwaffe Resource Group
 He 100 page contains a three view of the D-1 and some basic information
 This page includes a description similar to that from The Encyclopedia, as well as links to a number of images of the aircraft.

He 100
1930s German fighter aircraft
Single-engined tractor aircraft
Low-wing aircraft
World War II fighter aircraft of Germany
Aircraft first flown in 1938